Skye Wallace is a Canadian singer-songwriter currently based in Toronto, Ontario. Wallace has released four studio albums: This Is How We Go (2013), Living Parts (2014), Something Wicked (2016), and Skye Wallace (2019). Wallace opened for Matt Mays on his 2019 tour.

Discography

Studio albums 

 This Is How We Go (2013)
 Living Parts (2014)
 Something Wicked (2016)
 Skye Wallace (2019)
 Terribly Good (2022)

Singles 

 "Blood Moon" / "Mean Song 2" (2016)
 "Scarlet Fever" (2017)
 "There is a Wall" (2019)
 "Coal in Your Window" (2019)

References 

Living people
Canadian singer-songwriters
Year of birth missing (living people)